is a Japanese track and field athlete who specializes in long-distance running.

She won the gold medal in the 1500 metres at the 2018 Asian Junior Athletics Championships. In Japanese national championships she won a bronze medal in the 5000 metres in 2019, and the silver medal over the same distance in 2020; in 2021 she won the gold medal in the 10,000 metres. She represented Japan in the 10,000 metres at the 2020 Summer Olympics, and led at 1000m and 2000m before finishing 7th with a personal best time of 31:00.71.

References

External links

2000 births
Living people
Japanese female long-distance runners
Athletes (track and field) at the 2020 Summer Olympics
Olympic athletes of Japan
21st-century Japanese women